Sabou is a department or commune of Boulkiemdé Province in central Burkina Faso. As of 2019 it has a population of 61,836. Its capital is the town of Sabou.

Towns and villages
SabouBourouGodéIpendoKoupélaNabadogoNadioloNamaneguemaNariou
NibagdoOuézindougouSaranaSaviliTanghin-Wobdo

References

Departments of Burkina Faso
Boulkiemdé Province